Devotion is the debut studio album by Canadian singer Mia Martina. The album was released in the United States and Canada on August 29, 2011. Devotion spawned three singles; lead single "Stereo Love" featuring Edward Maya, "Latin Moon", and "Burning" became hits, peaking within the top 30 on the Canadian Hot 100, and "Stereo Love" further peaking inside the top ten. The album peaked at number 77 on the Canadian Albums Chart.

Track listing

References

2011 debut albums
CP Music Group albums
Mia Martina albums